Blackadder: The Cavalier Years is a 15-minute one-off edition of Blackadder set during the English Civil War, shown as part of the first Comic Relief Red Nose Day on BBC1, broadcast on Friday 5 February 1988. The show featured Warren Clarke as a guest star.

Plot
The episode begins in November 1648. King Charles I of England, Scotland and Ireland (Stephen Fry) has already lost the Civil War. Only two men remain loyal to him: Sir Edmund Blackadder (Rowan Atkinson), the sole descendant of the Blackadder dynasty at the time, and his servant Baldrick Esq. (Tony Robinson). They have given refuge to the King in Blackadder Hall, where he is hiding in a thorn bush, having assured him that he is as likely to be caught "as a fox being chased by a pack of one-legged hunting tortoises". Sir Edmund remains loyal because, as a known royalist, he sees the King's survival as his only hope of survival. He also fears the spread of Puritanism, full of moral prohibitions (as he describes it, the Puritans will "close all the theatres, lace handkerchiefs for men will be illegal, and I won't have a friendly face to sit on this side of Boulogne!"). During Sir Edmund's short absence, Oliver Cromwell (Warren Clarke) himself suddenly arrives at Blackadder Hall, accompanied by a number of his Roundheads – supporters of the Parliament of England. Baldrick attempts to deny knowing the King's whereabouts, but blows the gaff when he asks Cromwell later to put down a purple cup, because "that's the King's".

The second scene takes place in the Tower of London, two weeks later. King Charles's prayers are interrupted by two subsequent visits. The first is from Cromwell, who warns him of his doom; and the second is by Sir Edmund, disguised as a priest, who informs the King (Stephen Fry) that he is planning to aid him in his escape. While Sir Edmund is still there, the King receives a notice that he has been sentenced to death. (This occurs in late November or early December 1648 within the context of this episode, though historically the death sentence came on 27 January 1649.)

As 29 January 1649 arrives and his execution approaches, King Charles is again visited by Sir Edmund. Though his plans for an escape have not materialised, he informs the King that there is still some hope. The Parliament has yet to find a man willing to be the King's executioner. Charles, rather philosophically, proclaims that he is not looking forward to his execution but "It's a question of balance, isn't it? Like so many other things." (Charles is very much a pastiche of his modern day namesake the Prince of Wales). Sir Edmund proceeds to assure Charles that no one would dare to become the King's executioner. Just as he says that, the King receives a notice that they have found his executioner.

Back at Blackadder Hall, Baldrick is singing happily as Sir Edmund proclaims his life to be in ruins. While Baldrick informs him that he has accepted a job, Sir Edmund wonders who could be so utterly without heart and soul, so low and degraded, as to behead the King of England. As his own words sink in, he questions Baldrick, who admits that it was he who accepted the position. (Historically, King Charles' executioner was suspected to be Richard Brandon.) Baldrick explains to the understandably enraged Blackadder that he has a cunning plan to save the King. He presents Sir Edmund with a huge pumpkin, poorly painted to represent a human face. He plans to place it on the King's head and chop it instead. Sir Edmund dismisses the plan, as Baldrick will have to hold the monarch's head in front of the crowd and proclaim "This is the head of a traitor", to which Sir Edmund predicts the response "No, it's not! It's a large pumpkin with a pathetic moustache drawn on it!" He then criticises Baldrick's stupidity ("Your head is as empty as a eunuch's underpants"). Baldrick, though saddened, says that at least the money, £1000, is good. At this, Sir Edmund's greed awakens, and he proceeds to take the money from Baldrick, announcing that he will replace him as the executioner, saying it needs somebody who actually has an axe. (From this point, Sir Edmund – who has hitherto shown uncharacteristic touches of conscience – behaves like a typical Blackadder.)

30 January 1649 arrives, and with it King Charles' day of execution. He is left alone for a few minutes with his executioner (Sir Edmund, in a hood and with a false voice). Sir Edmund takes advantage of these minutes to relieve the King of his remaining wealth: however, the King eventually recognises him, but mistakes Blackadder's intentions and congratulates him for trying to save him even at the last minute, before giving him custody of his infant son, the later King Charles II of England, Scotland and Ireland. (Historically, he was 19 years old at the time of his father's death.) As he cannot explain his betrayal to the King, Sir Edmund panics and uses the plan that Baldrick had suggested earlier. The camera then focuses on Baldrick, who is listening to the sounds of the execution. Sir Edmund chops the pumpkin and proclaims "This is the head of a traitor." Predictably enough, the crowd answers him, "No, it's not! It's a huge pumpkin with a pathetic moustache drawn on it!" Sir Edmund apologises and says he will try again. Baldrick continues to listen as Sir Edmund beheads the King and the crowd cheers.

As the last scene begins, Sir Edmund and Baldrick have returned to Blackadder Hall. A disgusted Blackadder cradles the infant Charles in his hands. Baldrick tries to console him by saying that at least he tried, and that now the future of the British monarchy lies fast asleep in his arms in the person of this infant prince. He suggests to his master that he should be ready to escape to France, because as a known Royalist, he is in danger of being arrested by the Roundheads and beheaded. Sir Edmund, who apparently had forgotten that he is in danger, immediately rises from his seat, ready to take action. But it is too late; Roundheads are already at the Hall's doors, demanding his surrender. Sir Edmund explains to Baldrick that there is no choice for a man of honour but to stand and fight, and die in defence of his future sovereign. However, as a Blackadder, he was never a man of honour. Passing the prince to Baldrick, he proceeds to remove his long black hair (which was apparently a wig), his false moustache and beard, to reveal a Roundhead appearance – short blond hair and a clean-shaven face. Thus unrecognisable, when Cromwell enters the room, he denounces Baldrick as "royalist scum". The episode ends with a hapless Baldrick, still holding the Prince in his arms, being approached by Cromwell, sword drawn.

Cast
Rowan Atkinson as Sir Edmund Blackadder
Tony Robinson as Baldrick, Esquire
Stephen Fry as King Charles I
Warren Clarke as Oliver Cromwell
Harry Enfield as the narrator

Hugh Laurie appeared as Cromwell's guard and Tim McInnerny was one of the voices in the crowd at the execution, both uncredited.

Production
Fry based his interpretation of King Charles on the then Prince of Wales, but now King Charles III. In series chronology, this episode takes place between the second and third series of the show, although it was produced after the third series had aired. The kitchen set is a redress of the servants' quarters from the third series. A behind the scenes studio tape was found in 2019 and was released by Kaleidoscope on their YouTube channel.

References

External links

Transcript and information at Blackadderhall.com

Blackadder episodes
British television specials
Comic Relief
1988 British television episodes
Fiction set in 1648
Fiction set in 1649
Television shows written by Ben Elton
1988 television specials
Television episodes about the English Civil War
Television shows written by Richard Curtis
Cultural depictions of Charles I of England
Cultural depictions of Oliver Cromwell